Prunus undulata, which goes by a number of common names including , lekh arupate and theiarlung, is a species of laurel cherry native to southeast Asia, including Nepal, Bhutan, Sikkim, Bangladesh, northeastern India, Myanmar, southeastern China, Aceh in Indonesia, Laos, Thailand and  Vietnam. A tree reaching 16m, prefers to grow alongside streams at 500 to 3600m above sea level. A widespread and successful species, it has been repeatedly described, resulting in a plethora of synonyms. Of these, the specific epithet capricida refers to its legendary ability to poison goats who consume it.

References

undulata
Flora of the Indian subcontinent
Flora of Indo-China
Flora of Sumatra
Flora of South-Central China
Plants described in 1825